A list of Elected members of the Pakistan Tehreek-e-Insaf in election 2013 to various national and provincial assemblies in Pakistan.

Azad Kashmir Assembly
Sardar Imtiaz Khan

National Assembly 

List of elected Members of the National Assembly from Pakistan Tehreek-e-Insaf.

Khyber Pakhtunkhwa Assembly 

List of elected Members of the Khyber Pakhtunkhwa Assembly from Pakistan Tehreek-e-Insaf.

Punjab Assembly 

List of elected Members of the Punjab Assembly from Pakistan Tehreek-e-Insaf.

Sindh Assembly 

List of elected Members of the Sindh Assembly from Pakistan Tehreek-e-Insaf.

References

Pakistan Tehreek-e-Insaf